Gold Strike may refer to:
Gold Strike (drink), alcoholic drink 
Gold Strike (horse), Canadian champion racehorse
Gold Strike Casino Resort, Tunica Resorts, Mississippi
Gold Strike Hotel, casino hotel near Boulder City, Nevada, now the Hoover Dam Lodge
Gold Strike Hotel and Gambling Hall, Jean, Nevada, now Terrible's Hotel & Casino
Gold Strike Resorts, company 
Gold Strike Canyon-Sugarloaf Mountain Traditional Cultural Property